Chiana Senior High School (CHIANASCO) is a mixed second-cycle institution located in Chiana in the Kassena-Nankana West District in the Upper East Region of Ghana.

History 
The school was established on 1 January 1991. In 2017, the headmistress of the school was Mrs. Margaret Bobi. The population of the school in 2017 was 1,434 students. In 2022, the headmistress of the school is Ivy Betur Naaso.

References 

High schools in Ghana
Public schools in Ghana
1991 establishments in Ghana